The Ministry of Justice of Sint Maarten oversees public safety, law and order, and the upholding of justice in Sint Maarten. The ministry is responsible for the following agencies:

 Immigration and Border Protection Service
 Police Corps of St. Maarten
 Customs
 Prison and House of Detention
 Financial Intelligence Unit
 Internal Services

Also, the following organizations fall within the justice sector and report to the Minister of Justice:

 Coast Guard
 Court of Guardianship
 Judicial Facilities Foundation (Probation & Family Supervision)
 Youth Correctional Foundation

List of Ministers of Justice

See also 

 Justice ministry
 Politics of Sint Maarten

References 

Justice ministries
Government of Sint Maarten